Miroslav Horčic (3 August 1921 – 14 January 2017) was a Czech sprinter. He competed in the men's 100 metres at the 1952 Summer Olympics.

References

1921 births
2017 deaths
Athletes (track and field) at the 1952 Summer Olympics
Czech male sprinters
Olympic athletes of Czechoslovakia
Place of birth missing